Ciuc may refer to:

 Ciuc Mountains, a mid-high range of mountains of Harghita County in Transylvania
 Ciuc County, a former county in the Kingdom of Romania
 Miercurea Ciuc, county seat of Harghita County, Romania

See also 
 Ciucaș (disambiguation)